Paul Shapiro (born 1939) is an American Abstract Expressionist and landscape painter.

New Mexican author Jon Carver writes of Shapiro's work: "Paul's interest in art and his commitment to painting is unassailable and extends to the depths of his being."

Early life and education
Paul Shapiro was born in Boston, Massachusetts, on December 26, 1939. He studied at Northeastern University from 1957 to 1958 and then the School of the Museum of Fine Arts, Boston from 1959 to 1962.

Artwork
In the 1960s, Shapiro was part of the Abstract Expressionist movement, but a 1970 Paris exhibition of early 20th century Expressionist painters inspired him to pursue landscape painting for the next two decades. His works were characterized by bold color and gesture. His 1982 move to Santa Fe, New Mexico, crystallized his love of landscape painting. In the 1990s, he shifted back to nonobjective abstract, but influenced of the land can still be discerned in his recent paintings.

Paul Shapiro creates visceral abstract paintings on paper and panels. His recent series, Quatumscape, is inspired by natural forces and the landscape.

<blockquote">Even though my work was fairly loose and abstract, I felt very confined by the envelope around recognizable forms and gravity-based relationships. In my abstract paintings, I have tried to create a concrete reality that brings an invisible world to the surface: evocative implications of a suggested parallel reality similar to what happens in poetry." —Paul Shapiro

Art career
Shapiro has exhibited internationally, throughout the United States and from Switzerland to Denmark. In 2010, he won the New Mexico Governor's Award for Excellence in the Arts.

Selected solo exhibitions
 2010: Survey Exhibition of painting, GF Contemporary, Santa Fe, New Mexico.
 2008: Survey of Abstract Paintings 1990–2008. Zane Bennett Gallery, Santa Fe, New Mexico.

Selected group exhibitions
 2006: Art and Infinity. Santa Fe Community College, Curated by Jon Carver, Santa Fe, New Mexico.
 1992: American Realism Figurative Painting. Cline Fine Art, Santa Fe, New Mexico.
 1992–91: Untitled Show. Galerie Roswitha Benkert, Zurich, Switzerland.
 1991: 'was in to art in this year, Fort Worth, Texas
 1990,89,88: Los Angeles Art Expo, Los Angeles, California
 1989: Art in the Embassies Program, Copenhagen, Denmark
 1988: Golem! Danger, Deliverance & Art. The Jewish Museum, New York, New York.

References

External links
 Paul Shapiro Studio, official website

Further reading
 D'Emilio, Sandra. Paul Shapiro: Artist as Explorer. Santa Fe: Cline Fine Art Gallery, 1992. ASIN B004OG93R2.

Living people
American contemporary painters
Northeastern University alumni
Artists from Boston
Painters from New Mexico
1939 births
Jewish American artists
20th-century American painters
American male painters
21st-century American Jews
20th-century American male artists